Houghton and Washington East was, from 1997 until 2010, a constituency represented in the House of Commons of the Parliament of the United Kingdom. It elected one Member of Parliament (MP) by the first past the post system of election.  A seat with similar boundaries, Houghton and Washington, existed from 1983 until 1997.

History
The constituency of Houghton and Washington was created as a result of the Boundary Commission for England review of parliamentary seats for the 1983 general election following the reorganisation of local government under the Local Government Act 1972 which brought the metropolitan county of Tyne and Wear into existence. It covered the majority of the abolished Houghton-le-Spring seat (those areas now within the metropolitan borough (now City) of Sunderland - including the communities of Houghton-le-Spring, Hetton-le-Hole, Penshaw, Shiney Row, and Herrington), together with the new town of Washington, which had previously been part of the abolished Chester-le-Street seat.

This constituency was abolished by the Boundary Commission for the 1997 general election and replaced by Houghton and Washington East. The wards of Washington East and Washington South were included in the new constituency of Gateshead East and Washington West. Ryhope was transferred in from Sunderland South.

This was, in turn, abolished for the 2010 general election when the Boundary Commission reduced the number of seats in Tyne and Wear from 13 to 12, with the constituencies in the City of Sunderland, in particular, being reorganised. The majority of the seat was now included in the new Houghton and Sunderland South constituency, with "Washington West" being transferred to Washington and Sunderland West. Ryhope was moved back out and included in Sunderland Central.

Boundaries

1983–1997 (Houghton and Washington) 

 The Metropolitan Borough of Sunderland wards of Eppleton, Hetton, Houghton, Shiney Row, Washington East, Washington North, Washington South, and Washington West.

1997–2010 (Houghton and Washington East) 

 The City of Sunderland wards of Eppleton, Hetton, Houghton, Ryhope, Shiney Row, Washington East, and Washington North.

Members of Parliament

Elections

Elections in the 2000s

Elections in the 1990s

Elections in the 1980s

See also
History of parliamentary constituencies and boundaries in Tyne and Wear

Notes and references 

Politics of the City of Sunderland
Constituencies of the Parliament of the United Kingdom established in 1983
Constituencies of the Parliament of the United Kingdom disestablished in 2010
Parliamentary constituencies in Tyne and Wear (historic)